Etsha is an area of villages in the Ngamiland West sub-district of Botswana. Refugees from the 1969 war in Angola were resettled in the area and formed 13 villages numbered Etsha 1 to Etsha 13. A resettlement study was published about it in he 1970s.  A study of basketmakers in Etsha was published in 1984. The development of commercial craft industries have been targeted in the community, including palm-frond weaving.

Villages
 Etsha 6
 Etsha 13

References

Botswana